Chirag Vohra is an Indian television, stage and film actor. He has acted in films like Tere Bin Laden, Billu, Heyy Babyy, Mangal Pandey: The Rising, Jaago and Rehnaa Hai Terre Dil Mein and Scam 1992 (2020).

He is well known theater artist.  He is famous for his role of Phoolmani in the play Master Phoolmani.  Plays he has performed in include Gandhi Ke Godse and Kishan vs Kanhaiya, and Lagan Gadu Chale Adu. 
His image is used in advertisements, including for Choloromint and Pond's.

He played in many Gujarati and Hindi TV serials including Hum Paanch and Saraswatichandra, and the role of Bhaiya in the daily comic serial Bhai Bhaiya Aur Brother. He also played in OMG – Oh My God!.

Filmography

Films

Web series

References

Living people
Indian male television actors
Year of birth missing (living people)